Chilecito Airport is a public use airport located  southeast of Chilecito, La Rioja, Argentina.

See also
List of airports in Argentina

References

External links 
 Airport record for Chilecito Airport at Landings.com

Airports in La Rioja Province, Argentina
La Rioja Province, Argentina